Bistriopelma is a genus of spider, being a theraphosine theraphosid (tarantula).

Etymology
The generic name Bistriopelma comes from the Latin bi- meaning "two" and strio meaning "stripe". This refers to the dorsolateral urticating patches of which there are two, both of which have a stripe of thick hair.

Characteristics
Bistriopelma has two distinctive patches of Type III urticating setae, which are located dorsolaterally on the abdomen, each with a long stripe of thicker setae, which runs diagonally to the longitudal body axis. The female spermathecae are nearly parallel, and the male's embolus curves retrolaterally from the tegulum (base).

Species
 it contains six species, found in Peru:

Bistriopelma fabianae Quispe-Colca & Kaderka, 2020 – Peru
Bistriopelma kiwicha Nicoletta, Chaparro, Mamani, Ochoa, West & Ferretti, 2020 – Peru
Bistriopelma lamasi Kaderka, 2015 – Peru
Bistriopelma matuskai Kaderka, 2015 – Peru
Bistriopelma peyoi Nicoletta, Chaparro, Mamani, Ochoa, West & Ferretti, 2020 – Peru
Bistriopelma titicaca Kaderka, 2017 – Peru

References

Theraphosidae
Theraphosidae genera
Endemic fauna of Peru
Fauna of Peru
Spiders of South America